The 2012–13 Football League Championship was the 128th season in the history of Millwall Football Club. It was their 87th season as a Football League side and their 38th in the second tier of English football. This season marked Millwall's third continuous season in the Championship, after promotion from League One in 2010. This was manager Kenny Jackett's fifth and final season in charge of the club, he resigned at the end of the campaign on 7 May 2013.

Millwall reached the semi-final of the FA-Cup for only the fifth time in their history, losing to Wigan Athletic. In the league, Millwall flirted with the play-offs in the first half of the season, after a 13-game unbeaten run, but they finished poorly and narrowly avoided relegation by two points on the last day of the season.

Matches
Millwall kicked off their pre-season campaign with a tour of Ireland, playing in the Republic of Ireland for two games before crossing the border to finish with a match in Northern Ireland. They returned to England for three more away games before the Football League Championship kicked off.

Pre-season

Championship

FA Cup

League Cup

League table

Results summary

Result round by round

Squad statistics

Appearances and goals

|-
|colspan="14"|Players who featured for club, who have left:

|}

Top scorers

Disciplinary record

Squad

Detailed overview

International Call-ups

Transfers

In

Loans in

Out

Loans Out

Contracts

References

External links
Official Website

Millwall F.C. seasons
Millwall